Claymore Creek is a stream in the U.S. state of South Dakota.

Claymore Creek has the name of Basil Claymore, a pioneer settler.

See also
List of rivers of South Dakota

References

Rivers of Corson County, South Dakota
Rivers of South Dakota